Ballads is a studio album by English jazz pianist/vocalist Liane Carroll. It was released in April 2013 by Quietmoney Recordings and distributed by Proper Records.

The album was recorded in Hastings, Sussex, England and produced by James McMillan. It features Mark Edwards (piano), Gwilym Simcock (piano), Julian Siegel (bass clarinet) and Kirk Whalum (tenor saxophone) with orchestration and big band arrangements by Chris Walden, and includes Sophie Bancroft's song "Calgary Bay", performed with the Prague Philharmonic Orchestra.

The album received four-starred reviews in The Observer, The Guardian, the London Evening Standard and LondonJazz.

Reception
In a four-starred review for The Guardian, John Fordham said: "Carroll's subtle pitching, tone colouration and jazz improviser's timing reinvent Here's to Life as a distilled understatement accompanied only by acoustic guitar; her earthiness is revealingly complemented by soft strings on Goodbye; and Mad About the Boy is so slow as to be prayer-like".

Peter Quinn, for Jazzwise Magazine, said "Ballads sees Liane nail 11 terrific songs in magisterial fashion... Widely recorded by instrumentalists (Cannonball Adderley, McCoy Tyner) and vocalists (Dinah Washington, Frank Sinatra) alike, ‘Goodbye’ has always been an exceptional song, but in Liane's hands it charts untold depths of emotion. This is one of the few indispensable vocal jazz albums of recent years".

Dave Gelly in The Observer, gave the album four stars and said of Carroll's performance on  Ballads that "Surrounded by a changing cast of the best musicians around, illuminated by piquant arrangements, her singing takes on a new, glowing depth".

Chris Parker, reviewing the album for LondonJazz, said: "Carroll does not merely interpret these songs, she inhabits them, intimately confiding in her listeners so that everything from Todd Rundgren's ‘Pretending to Care’ and Carole King's ‘Will You Still Love Me Tomorrow’ to more conventional jazz standards (‘Mad About the Boy’, ‘My One and Only Love’) is imbued with unaffectedly sincere, heartfelt emotion".

Bruce Lindsay, for All About Jazz, described Carroll's performance of "Mad About The Boy" as "heartbreaking". "She sings as though she's aware of the futility of her desire but unwilling, or unable, to leave it behind. It shows the greatness of Coward's little ditty, the many emotions that the song can reveal – and the majesty of Carroll's voice. It's just one highlight of many on this exquisite album: Ballads is a classic-in-waiting".

Jack Massarick, in a four-starred review for the London Evening Standard, said; "[W]ith symphonic strings or just solo piano or guitar cushioning her tranquil path, there's abundant time to savour her tender side and the mature timbre of her voice".

Track listing

 Here's To Life (Artie Butler, Phyllis Molinary), 3:26	
 Goodbye (Gordon Jenkins) 5:22	
 Only The Lonely (Sammy Cahn, Jimmy Van Heusen, 3:05	
 Mad About The Boy (Noël Coward), 6:26	
 You've Changed (Bill Carey, Carl Fischer), 4:36	
 Pretending To Care (Todd Rundgren), 4:59	
 Calgary Bay (Sophie Bancroft), 4:48	
 My One And Only Love (Guy Wood, Robert Mellin), 3:41	
 Will You Still Love Me Tomorrow (Gerry Goffin, Carole King), 4:09	
 The Two Lonely People	(Bill Evans, Carol Hall),  3:39	
 Raining In My Heart (Boudleaux Bryant, Felice Bryant), 3:22

Personnel
 Liane Carroll: vocals, piano
 James McMillan: trumpet, vibes, keyboard
 Mark Edwards: piano, celeste
 Gwilym Simcock: piano
 Mark Jaimes: guitar
 Steve Pearce: bass
 Roger Carey: bass
 Mark Hodgson: bass
 Chris Hill: bass
 Mark Fletcher: drums
 Ralph Salmins: drums
 Kirk Whalum: tenor saxophone
 Simon Gardner: trumpet
 Noel Langley: trumpet
 Andy Gathercole: trumpet
 Andy Baxter: trumpet
 Pete Beachill: trombone
 Chris Dean: trombone
 Pete North: trombone
 Richard Whigley: trombone
 Sammy Maine: saxophone
 Patrick Clahar: saxophone
 Julian Siegel: saxophone
 Ben Castle: saxophone
 Jamie Talbot: saxophone
 City of Prague Philharmonic Orchestra

Album cover
The album cover artwork is by Brighton-based artist, Lester Magoogan.

References and footnotes

External links
Liane Carroll: official website 
LondonJazz podcast interview with Liane Carroll about Ballads

2013 albums
Albums produced by James McMillan
Liane Carroll albums